Parignya Pandya Shah (Hindi: Prajñā Pāṇḍyā Śāha) (born 9 November 1985), also known as Parignya Pandya and Parigna Pandya, is an Indian actress, voice-dubbing actress and trained classical singer.  She speaks English, Hindi, Marathi and Gujarati.
 
As a film actress, she had a small role in the 2009 Hindi film, Kabira Calling, starring Salil Jamdar.

Personal life
Shah was married to Ketul Shah on 7 December 2008.

Career
Other than a small role in the 2009 Indian film, Kabira Calling, Shah's career has been as a voice-over artist, beginning when she was 12 years old.  For the third Harry Potter film she took over from Rajshree Nath, as the voice for Emma Watson.  Since then, she has been the official Hindi voice-over for Watson. Shah also voiced Watson's role as Pauline Fossil in the 2007 British TV film, Ballet Shoes.

When Shah did the Hindi voice-over for Hermione in (Harry Potter and the Prisoner of Azkaban), she knew virtually nothing about the series.  However, she read the complete series in order to prepare for the role, after which she became a big fan. One thing she hadn't expected was for the characters of Ron and Hermione to end up together.

She continued to be the voice Hermione for the remainder of the series, along with her colleagues: Karan Trivedi (who dubbed Harry Potter in films 2–5), Rajesh Kava (Harry Potter in the last 3 films), Nachiket Dighe (Ronald Weasley), Saumya Daan (both Fred and George Weasley), Rishabh Shukla (Voldemort), Dilip Sinha (Hagrid), Anil Datt (Dumbledore in the first two films and Arthur Weasley in all films from the second), Ali Khan (Severus Snape)  and Vikrant Chaturvedi (Dumbledore in the later films).  She has been the Hindi dubbing voice for Vanessa Hudgens's role as Gabriella Montez in the High School Musical film series and for Kirsten Stewart as Bella Swan in The Twilight Saga.  For foreign animation, she is very well known for voicing the character: "Gwendolyn Tennyson" in Hindi for all the Ben 10 series, even dubbing over Haley Ramm's role in the Hindi dub of the Ben 10: Race Against Time film.

According to her Twitter, it's revealed that she is the Hindi singing voice for Minnie Mouse.

Filmography

Live action films

Animated films

Dubbing roles

Live action television series

Animated series

Live action films

Animated films

See also
Dubbing (filmmaking)
List of Indian Dubbing Artists

References

External links
 Parignya Pandya at Indian film trade.
 http://muggleindia.blogspot.com/2007/10/meet-dubbing-stars.html

1985 births
Living people
Indian child actresses
Indian voice actresses
Indian women classical singers
21st-century Indian singers
21st-century Indian women singers
21st-century Indian child actresses